João Carlos de Albuquerque Melo Barroso (February 28, 1950 - August 12, 2019) was a Brazilian actor.

Career 
Barroso began his acting career when Argentine producers met eleven-year-old João Carlos playing soccer on the sidewalks of Bolivar street in Copacabana. Later he was invited to participate in "Tercer Mundo" film which was shot in the hills of the city. This film was a Brazil-Argentina co-production filmed in 1961 and released only in 1973. With his work in this film, he was invited to perform in Luigi Pirandello's play "Man, Beast and Virtue". For his performance, Barroso received several theatrical revelation awards in 1962.
Barroso made his debut on Rede Globo in the series "Rua da Matriz", the station's first dramaturgical production, in 1965, mending a sequence of productions by the company over the next decades. Among his most popular TV characters are Tavico in Estúpido Cupido (1976) and Toninho Jiló in Roque Santeiro (1985), the latter his most outstanding character.
Barroso died on August 12, 2019, in Rio de Janeiro after a long battle against pancreatic cancer.

Filmography

References 

1950 births
2019 deaths
Brazilian male film actors
Brazilian male television actors
Brazilian male voice actors
Deaths from cancer in Rio de Janeiro (state)
Deaths from pancreatic cancer
Male actors from Rio de Janeiro (city)